Gaslamp Quarter station is a station of the Green and Silver Lines on the San Diego Trolley. It is located in the Gaslamp Quarter section of the city and serves the surrounding trendy neighborhood. A variety of entertainment destinations and restaurants, as well as Petco Park, are accessible from the station.

This station opened June 30, 1990 as part of the Orange Line's (then called the East Line) Bayside Extension; it should not be confused with the original Gaslamp (North) station that opened in 1981 and was permanently renamed the Fifth Avenue station in 1986.

The station remained open while undergoing renovations from February through July 2013, as part of the Trolley Renewal Project.

On September 2, 2012, service to this station by the Orange Line was replaced by the Green Line as part of a system redesign.

Station layout
There are two tracks, each with a side platform. A third track handles freight operations on the line. Silver Line heritage service operates Friday through Sunday only.

See also
 List of San Diego Trolley stations

References

Green Line (San Diego Trolley)
Silver Line (San Diego Trolley)
San Diego Trolley stations in San Diego
Railway stations in the United States opened in 1986
Gaslamp Quarter, San Diego
1986 establishments in California